The Santa Fe Refrigerator Despatch  was a railroad refrigerator car line established as a subsidiary of the Atchison, Topeka and Santa Fe Railway in 1884 to carry perishable commodities. Though the line started out with a mere 25 ventilated fruit cars and 8 ice-cooled refrigerator cars, by 1910 its roster had swollen to 6,055 total units (compared to the 8,100 units its largest competitor, the Pacific Fruit Express, operated).

As of 1929 the line was carrying some 43 percent of California's citrus crop, most of which travelled aboard its "Green Fruit Express" refrigerator car special. Some 100,000 produce loads were shipped from the fields of Arizona and California to East Coast markets each growing season.

Santa Fe Refrigerator Despatch Roster, 1890–1970:

Source: The Great Yellow Fleet, p. 17.

References
 
 
 White, John H.  (1986).  The Great Yellow Fleet.  Golden West Books, San Marino, CA.  .

External links
 Atchison, Topeka, & Santa Fe Railway #21335 — photo and short history of a steel-sheathed "billboard" car.
 "Coast to Coast" article by Richard Hendrickson at the Pacific Southwest Railway Museum official website.

1894 establishments in the United States
Refrigerator car lines of the United States